Camp Slope is a concave slope at about  just south of Crystal Slope on the west side of the summit cone of Mount Erebus, Ross Island. The feature is the site of a slump which has occurred off the crater rim. It is also a former camp site used by summit parties. A small hut is located on the upper part of the slope.

References
 

Landforms of Ross Island